The 2002 Intercontinental Cup was an association football match played on 3 December 2002, between Real Madrid of Spain, winners of the 2001–02 UEFA Champions League, and Olimpia of Paraguay, winners of the 2002 Copa Libertadores. The match was played for the first time in the tournament's history at the International Stadium Yokohama in Yokohama. This encounter marked a special occasion for Olimpia and Real Madrid, as both teams celebrated their centenary in 2002.

Ronaldo opened the scoring for Real Madrid in the 14th minute shooting low right footed past the goalkeeper from inside the penalty box. The second goal was scored by Guti in the 84th minute, heading home at the near post after a cross from Luís Figo on the right.

Venue

Match details

See also
2001–02 UEFA Champions League
2002 Copa Libertadores
2002–03 Real Madrid CF season
Real Madrid CF in international football

References

External links
FIFA Article
Copa Europea/Sudamericana – Toyota 2002 CONMEBOL.com

Intercontinental Cup
Intercontinental Cup
Intercontinental Cup
Intercontinental Cup (football)
Intercontinental Cup 2002
Intercontinental Cup 2002
2002
Inter
Sports competitions in Yokohama
December 2002 sports events in Asia
2000s in Yokohama
2002 in association football